The 2015 WGC-HSBC Champions was a golf tournament played from 5–8 November 2015 at the Sheshan Golf Club in Shanghai, China. It was the seventh WGC-HSBC Champions tournament, and the fourth of four World Golf Championships events held in 2015.

Russell Knox won by 2 strokes from Kevin Kisner. Danny Willett had a last round 62 to finish joint third with Ross Fisher, a further stroke behind. Knox was playing in his first WGC event and became the first Scot to win a World Golf Championship. Knox had only earned entry as third alternate.

Field
The following is a list of players who qualified for the 2015 WGC-HSBC Champions. The criteria for invitation differed from 2014, with a move towards the leaders in points lists rather than tournament winners. Players who qualify from multiple categories are listed in the first category in which they are eligible with the other qualifying categories in parentheses next to the player's name.

1. Winners of the four major championships and The Players Championship
Rickie Fowler (3,4), Jordan Spieth (3,4)
Jason Day (3,4) and Zach Johnson (3,4) did not play

2. Winners of the previous four World Golf Championships
Dustin Johnson (3,4), Shane Lowry (3,5), Rory McIlroy (3,4,5), Bubba Watson (3,4)

3. Top 50 from the OWGR on 19 October
Kiradech Aphibarnrat (5), Daniel Berger (4), Paul Casey (4), Sergio García (5), Branden Grace (5), Emiliano Grillo, Thongchai Jaidee (5), Martin Kaymer (5), Chris Kirk, Kevin Kisner (4), Søren Kjeldsen (5), Anirban Lahiri (5), Danny Lee (4), Marc Leishman, David Lingmerth, Hunter Mahan, Hideki Matsuyama (4), Kevin Na (4), Louis Oosthuizen (4,5), Scott Piercy (4), Patrick Reed (4), Charl Schwartzel (5), Adam Scott, Henrik Stenson (4,5), Robert Streb (4), Andy Sullivan (5), Lee Westwood, Bernd Wiesberger (5), Danny Willett (5), Gary Woodland

Jim Furyk (4), Bill Haas (4), Charley Hoffman (4), J. B. Holmes (4), Billy Horschel, Brooks Koepka (4), Matt Kuchar (4), Phil Mickelson, Ryan Palmer, Justin Rose (4,5), Brandt Snedeker (4), and Jimmy Walker (4) did not play

4. Top 30 from the final 2015 FedEx Cup points list (if there are less than five available players, players beyond 30th will be selected to increase the number to five)
Steven Bowditch, Harris English, Matt Jones, Daniel Summerhays, Justin ThomasBae Sang-moon did not play due to military service5. Top 30 from the Race to Dubai as of 26 October
An Byeong-hun, Luke Donald, Ross Fisher, Matt Fitzpatrick, Tommy Fleetwood, David Howell, Miguel Ángel Jiménez, James Morrison, Alex Norén, Thorbjørn Olesen, Thomas Pieters, Marc Warren, Chris WoodGeorge Coetzee did not play6. The leading four available players from the Asian Tour Order of Merit as of 26 October
Shiv Chawrasia, Andrew Dodt, Scott Hend, Richard T. Lee

7. The leading two available players from the Japan Golf Tour Order of Merit as of 26 October
Kim Kyung-tae, Satoshi KodairaYuta Ikeda did not play8. The leading two available players from the final 2014 PGA Tour of Australasia Order of Merit
Greg Chalmers, Steven Jeffress

9. The leading two available players from the final 2014 Sunshine Tour Order of Merit
Thomas Aiken, Daniel van Tonder

10. Six players from China
Cao Yi, Dou Zecheng, Li Haotong, Liang Wenchong, Wu Ashun, Zhang Xinjun

11. Alternates, if needed to fill the field of 78 players
The next available player on the Orders of Merit of the Asian Tour, Japan Golf Tour, Sunshine Tour, and PGA Tour of Australasia, ranked in order of their position in the OWGR as of 19 October
Next available player, not otherwise exempt, from Race to Dubai as of 26 October, OWGR as of 19 October, FedEx Cup list:
Hiroshi Iwata (Japan)
Danny Chia (Asia)
Trevor Fisher Jnr (Sunshine)
Nick Cullen (Australasia)
Tyrrell Hatton (Race to Dubai; replaced George Coetzee)
Ian Poulter (OWGR; replaced Brandt Snedeker)
Russell Knox (FedEx Cup; replaced J. B. Holmes)
Cameron Smith (Asia; replaced Billy Horschel)

Nationalities in the field 

Past champions in the field

Note: the HSBC Champions became a WGC event in 2009; winners before this are not listed.

Round summaries
First roundThursday, 5 November 2015Branden Grace shot a 9-under-par 63 to take a one-stroke lead over Steven Bowditch, Kevin Kisner, and Thorbjørn Olesen.

Second roundFriday, 6 November 2015Kevin Kisner shot a second-round 66 to take a two stroke lead over Russell Knox, who shot the low round of the day, 65. First-round leader Branden Grace shot a 71 to fall to third place, four strokes behind Kisner. Li Haotong, of China, moved up the leaderboard to a tie for 4th with a second-round 69.

Third roundSaturday, 7 November 2015Sunday, 8 November 2015Third round play did not finish Saturday due to Russell Knox choosing not to play the last hole due to darkness. When he finished his hole on Sunday, he was tied for the lead with Kevin Kisner at 16-under-par. They were one stroke ahead of Dustin Johnson and Li Haotong.

Final roundSunday, 8 November 2015Russell Knox shot a final round 68 to beat Kevin Kisner by two strokes. Li Haotong's T7 finish was the highest PGA Tour finish for a Chinese player.

ScorecardCumulative tournament scores, relative to par''
Source:

References

External links
Coverage on Asian Tour's official site
Coverage on European Tour's official site
Coverage on PGA Tour's official site

2015
2015 in golf
2015 in Chinese sport
November 2015 sports events in China